"The Original" is the first episode in the first season premiere of the HBO science fiction western thriller television series Westworld. The teleplay was written by series co-creators Jonathan Nolan and Lisa Joy, who also receive story credit with Michael Crichton, writer and director of the 1973 film upon which the series is based. The episode was directed by Nolan, and is dedicated to the memory of Eddie Rouse, who played Kissy.

"The Original" introduces the eponymous Western-themed amusement park from the perspectives of both the androids and the humans. It received positive reviews from critics, who praised the visuals, performances of the cast, story, thematic elements and world-building.

Plot summary
Westworld is a huge Western-themed park where human guests can interact with lifelike android "hosts", programmed to run through a daily narrative, without memory of prior days' events, and interact with guests. As hosts are unable to harm guests, guests often live out their darkest desires, including violent and sexual ones.

Hosts are artificially manufactured and don't exhibit some normal human reactions, for example, don't react to flies crawling over their faces. They can be put to hibernation or to other special states by code phrases said by park operators.

Dolores says goodbye to her father Peter and travels into Sweetwater for supplies where she meets Teddy. They rekindle their old flame, and she invites him back to her farm, but when they arrive they hear shooting inside the house. They find Peter beaten by two bandits, Walter and Rebus, bragging about raping and killing his wife. Teddy shoots and kills the bandits but finds he cannot kill a third approaching figure from elsewhere, the Man in Black. The Man in Black reveals he is a guest, kills Teddy, and then drags Dolores off, upset she does not recognize him after thirty years of visits.

The next day, the Sweetwater sheriff host malfunctions. At the operations center in the central Mesa, they find the problem due to the recent Reveries update from park creator Dr. Robert Ford, but lead programmer Bernard suggests they leave the other hosts with Reveries in place to help debug. That night, the bandit Walter, also updated with Reveries, turns violent on his men. Park QA director Theresa orders all hosts with Reveries to be brought in and checked, using a temporary narrative of a bandit massacre to hide this from the guests. The Man in Black tracks down a specific host, kills and scalps him to find an image of a map under his scalp.

The next morning, Peter finds a guest's photograph of the outside world, and he becomes confused. He whispers something to Dolores before she leaves. In town, the massacre starts. At the Mesa, Ford learns Peter wanted to tell Dolores the true nature of the park, while head of security Ashley Stubbs interviews Dolores who says Peter only told her "These violent delights have violent ends" but does not understand its meaning. After careful analysis, all hosts but Peter and Walter are cleared to return, while Peter and Walter are put into storage.

Dolores, Peter and other hosts are periodically questioned via checklists as part of QA. Dolores is asked whether she can hurt any living being and she answers resounding "no".

The next day, Dolores begins her usual routine, unaware of the surrogate in Peter's place for her father. While watching the sunrise, she swats and kills a fly that lands on her neck.

Production

"The Original" was written by series co-creators Jonathan Nolan and Lisa Joy, based on the premise of the 1973 film of the same name by Michael Crichton. The episode had a budget in the range of $25 million.

Filming

Directed by Nolan, "The Original" was filmed on August 29, 2014 in and around Los Angeles, California. Locations in California included Santa Clarita, at Melody Ranch in Newhall and at Paramount Ranch in Agoura. The episode was also filmed in southern Utah, specially Castle Valley and Fisher Valley.

Music
The score is composed by Ramin Djawadi. The episode also features piano and orchestral interpretations of Soundgarden's "Black Hole Sun" and The Rolling Stones' "Paint it Black". "Ain't No Grave" by Johnny Cash was played over the end credits.

In an interview, Djawadi spoke about the modern songs used in the episode. He said, "The show has an anachronistic feel to it, It's a Western theme park, and yet it has robots in it, so why not have modern songs? And that's a metaphor in itself, wrapped up in the overall theme of the show." Djawadi continued, "What's so great about using these pieces instead of the score is that they are known melodies, which enhances the idea that this is all scripted". He noted, "'Paint It Black' happens during a really big action scene, and it has all these great ups and downs — the shooting, the talking — and so I bring it down and then back up a bit, which was a lot of fun to arrange for the orchestra."

Reception

Ratings
"The Original" was viewed by 1.96 million American households on its initial viewing. The episode also acquired a 0.8 rating in the 18–49 demographic. The premiere drew 3.3 million viewers over three airings that night and early viewing on HBO’s streaming platforms, making it the most viewed series premiere HBO has had since True Detective. In the United Kingdom, the episode was seen by 1.7 million viewers on Sky Atlantic (the channel's highest-rated broadcast that week).

Critical reception
"The Original" received critical acclaim from critics with particular praise towards the visuals, story, the performances of the cast, thematic elements, and world building. The episode currently has a score of 100% on Rotten Tomatoes and has an average rating of 9.2 out of 10 based on 26 reviews. The site's consensus reads "The Original lays the vivid playground of Westworld before us in all its detail-heavy, morality-questioning, and mystery-filled glory."

Eric Goldman of IGN wrote in his review of the episode, "HBO's Westworld makes a strong first impression with its excellent premiere, as a theme park provides the setting for a fascinating exploration of the human—and not so human—psyche." He gave the episode a 9 out of 10. Scott Tobias  of The New York Times wrote in his review of the episode; "Based on the first episode of HBO's Westworld alone, creators Jonathan Nolan and Lisa Joy have built themselves a better model—which, in Crichton’s thinking, should increase the likelihood of things going awry. Crichton never invited us to think of the androids as anything more than exceptionally lifelike machines". Zack Handlen of The A.V. Club wrote in his review, "'The Original' is a terrific way to start. There are all sorts of possibilities here, and actors who don't get much to do (Thandie Newton, hello) but who'll presumably be more important as events unfold. And it's impressive to see how, with just some minor tweaking, the show manages to remake Westworld into something distinctively new." He gave the episode an A−. Liz Shannon Miller of IndieWire wrote in her review, "It's just the first episode, and already that control seems in flux as more questions arise. Can't wait to get a few more answers." She gave the episode an A−. Erik Kain of Forbes also reviewed the episode, saying, "I found the season premiere of Westworld gripping from start to finish. It ended on the perfect note, though I wish it had gone on much longer. I can’t wait for episode two, and hope desperately that this show continues to be as good as its opening episode. I love the mystery. I love the juxtaposition of two of my favorite genres—Westerns and science-fiction—and I love the sense of dread hanging over everything."

Accolades

References

External links

 "The Original" at HBO.com
 

2016 American television episodes
Westworld (TV series) episodes
Television episodes written by Jonathan Nolan
Television episodes directed by Jonathan Nolan